Cernon may refer to:
Cernon, Jura, a commune in the French region of Franche-Comté
Cernon, Marne, a commune in the French region of Champagne-Ardenne
Cernon (river), a contributor of the Garonne river, in the southern France
Lapanouse-de-Cernon, a commune in the French region of Midi-Pyrénées
Sainte-Eulalie-de-Cernon, a commune in the French region of Midi-Pyrénées
Saint-Rome-de-Cernon, a commune in the French region of Midi-Pyrénées